The Poet Laureate of Wisconsin is the poet laureate for the U.S. state of Wisconsin. The position and nominating commission was created by executive order from Governor Tommy Thompson on July 31, 2000. On February 4, 2011, Governor Scott Walker discontinued state sponsorship and sent a letter to the members of the Wisconsin Poet Laureate Commission to inform them it has been terminated. The Wisconsin Academy of Sciences, Arts & Letters assumed the role of the commission May of that year.

List of Poets Laureate
 Ellen Kort (2001–2004)
 Denise Sweet (2005–2008)
 Marilyn Taylor (2009–2010)
 Bruce Dethlefsen (2011–2012)
 Max Garland (2013–2014)
 Kimberly Blaeser (2015–2016)
 Karla Huston (2017-2018)
 Margaret Rozga (2019–2020)
 Dasha Kelly Hamilton (2021–present)

See also

 Poet laureate
 List of U.S. states' poets laureate
 United States Poet Laureate

References

External links
  Poet Laureate at Wisconsin Humanities
 Wisconsin Poet Laureate at Library of Congress

 
Wisconsin culture
American Poets Laureate